Xavier Rivera Marc (16 January 1948 – 19 February 2022) was a Mexican actor, known for his roles in Two Mules for Sister Sara, The Bridge in the Jungle, and The Legend of Zorro.

Life and career
He studied acting at the School of Theatre Arts of the National Institute of Fine Arts, in New York, at the Dimitrio Sarrás Studio, and at the academy of Uta Hagen and Herbert Berghof in New York. He received a grant from the French government to study the Brecht and Stanislavski methods in Paris. At the University of California at Los Angeles (UCLA) he took classes in screenwriting, acting, singing, and pantomime. He debuted as an actor in the theatre in the play "The Comedy of Errors" in 1960. Marc died on 19 February 2022, at the age of 74.

References

External links
 

1948 births
2022 deaths
Mexican male actors
Mexican male film actors
Mexican male television actors
Mexican film directors
Mexican cinematographers
People from Jalisco